Fire Fire is the second studio album released by Japanese metal band Ezo. It was released in 1989 on Geffen Records.

Track listing
All songs by EZO and Jody Gray except where indicated.

"Love Junkie" – 4:44
"Night Crawler" (EZO, Chris Gates, Gray, James Palace) – 4:21
"Fire Fire" – 5:51
"Wild Talk" – 4:37
"Burn Down the Night" – 4:39
"Black Moon" – 3:54
"Back to Zero" – 4:23
"Cold Blooded" (EZO, Gray, Palace, Stephan Galfas) – 3:59
"She's Ridin' the Rhythm" (EZO, Gray, Palace) – 3:54
"Streetwalker" (EZO, Gray, Palace) – 4:15
"Million Miles Away" (EZO, Gates, Gray) – 3:49

Personnel 
Band members
Masaki Yamada – vocals
Shoyo Iida – guitar
Taro Takahashi – bass
Hirotsugu Homma – drums

Additional musicians
John Mahoney – Sinclavier programming, backing vocals
Steve Grimmett, Jody Gray, Stephan Galfas, James Palace, Noah 'T.T.' Baron, Mark Corbin, Mio Vukovic, Norio Yamamoto, The Weed – backing vocals

Production
Stephan Galfas – producer, mixing
Jody Gray, James Palace – associate producers
Mark Corbin, Ellen Fitton – engineers
Noah Baron – mixing
George Marino – mastering at Sterling Sound, New York
Norio Yamamoto – coordinator

References

1989 albums
Geffen Records albums